Sriram Karri  (born 1973) is an English-language novelist, writer and columnist. His novel, The Autobiography of a Mad Nation, was longlisted for the Man Asian Literary Prize in 2009. His first book, The Spiritual Supermarket, was published by Mosaic Books for the Indian sub-continent in 2007. It was longlisted for the Vodafone Crossword Book Award, (Non-Fiction), in 2008.

Early life and education
Sriram Karri was born in October 1973 in Bilaspur, Madhya Pradesh (now part of Chhattisgarh).

He did his schooling from the South Eastern Railway (English Medium) School at Bilaspur. when a national scholarship conducted by the Ministry of Human Resources Development took him to Daly College as a Government Scholar. He was selected for the National Defence Academy (88th course, 5th rank in UPSC topper's list for Air Force). He could not join the National Defence Academy owing to a medical problem. He completed his graduation in arts from the BVK Degree College in Visakhapatnam, Andhra Pradesh, in History, Economic and Political Sciences. He was a member of Young Orators Club, Secunderabad.

Career
Starting his career as a journalist, he worked with The Indian Express, the Business Publication Division of the Indian Express Group and The Deccan Chronicle. He has been a columnist for The Hindu''' and wrote a fortnightly column, Sedition and Perdition, for The New Indian Express. He has contributed to the Comment is Free section of The Guardian and currently writes for the India Ink blogs at The New York Times.

As a full-time journalist, he wrote on Information Technology, Software, Web, IT Education and on other subjects including civic matters, public interest, social trends, political analysis, city life, education and careers, satire, and reviewed books and movies.

After he quit full-time journalism, he moved to a corporate career and handled communications, strategy, and branding of IT corporations including Infosys, Tata Consultancy Services, Magnaquest Technologies and Satyam Computer Services. He was part of the communications team of the Indian School of Business, where, as an associate editor, he brought out the school's magazine, Insight.

Published books
 The Spiritual Supermarket (Mosaic Books, 2007)
 Autobiography of a Mad Nation (Fingerprint! Publishing, 2014)

Awards
 2007: longlist for the Vodafone Crossword Book Award (Non-Fiction category), The Spiritual Supermarket 2009: longlist for the Man Asian Literary Prize (Fiction category), Autobiography of a Mad Nation''

References

External links
 Writing for Passion – Sriram Karri's blog
 Profile on MAN Asian Literary Prize site – Sriram Karri's profile on MAN Asian Literary Prize site
 Profile on The Guardian Website – Sriram Karri's profile on guardian.co.uk
 Gujarat's Lethal Ban On Alcohol – Article published on guardian.co.uk, 19 August 2009
 What's in an Indian name? – Article published on guardian.co.uk, 5 July 2009
 Indian politics is a family affair – Article published on guardian.co.uk, 13 June 2009
 India's battle of words – Article published on guardian.co.uk, 13 May 2009
 The power of India's regions – Article published on guardian.co.uk, 17 April 2009
 Defending India's reputation – Article published on guardian.co.uk, 12 April 2009
 India's history for sale – Article published on guardian.co.uk, 30 March 2009
 Articles in India Ink, NYT – Profile and List of Articles in India Ink, New York Times
 Congress Party Supports Creation of Telangana State – Article published on NYT Blogs, 30 July 2013
 India's Cyberabad Smiles as Rupee Falls – Article published on NYT Blogs, 4 September 2013
 Political Battles Intensify in Andhra Pradesh after Jailed Politician gets bail – Article published on NYT Blogs, 24 September 2013
 Unrest over Telangana brings Andhra Pradesh to a standstill – Article published on NYT Blogs, 9 October 2013
 45 killed in fiery bus crash in South India – Article published on NYT Blogs, 30 October 2013
 Interview in The Hindu

1973 births
Living people
Indian male journalists
Indian male novelists
21st-century English novelists
English male journalists
English male novelists
People from Bilaspur district, Chhattisgarh
21st-century Indian male writers